Samuel Alfred McCappin (10 August 1875 – 1945) was an English footballer who played in the Football League for Notts County.

References

1875 births
1945 deaths
English footballers
Association football goalkeepers
English Football League players
Ilford F.C. players
Notts County F.C. players